Arotrophora charistis is a species of moth of the family Tortricidae. It is found in Australia, where it has been recorded from Queensland.

The wingspan is about 13.5 mm.

References

Moths described in 1910
Arotrophora
Moths of Australia